FK Partizan Obršani is a football club based in village of Obršani near Prilep, North Macedonia. They were recently played in the Macedonian Second League.

History
The club was founded in 1947.

References

External links
Partizan Obršani Facebook 
Club info at MacedonianFootball 
Football Federation of Macedonia 

Partizan Obršani
Association football clubs established in 1947
1947 establishments in the Socialist Republic of Macedonia
FK .